Michael Johnson, Mike Johnson, Mick Johnson or Mickey Johnson may refer to:

Arts

Music

Mike Johnson (bassist) (born 1965), American songwriter and bass guitarist
Michael Johnson (drummer) (born 1982), American pop singer and drummer
Mike Johnson (guitarist) (born 1952), American experimental rock guitarist and composer
Michael Johnson (singer) (1944–2017), American pop, country and folk singer-songwriter and guitarist
Mike Johnson (steel guitarist), featured on country music albums such as Underneath the Same Moon
Mike Johnson (yodeler) (born 1946), American country music yodeler
Michael Johnson (known by his stage name Twisted Insane; born 1981), American rapper and songwriter

Other arts
Michael Johnson, founding member of the Aboriginal National Theatre Trust in Australia in 1987
Michael Johnson (graphic designer) (born 1964), British graphic designer
Mick Johnson, fictional character in the soap opera Brookside
Mike Johnson (animator), stop motion animator and recently co-director of Corpse Bride
Mike Johnson (author) (born 1947), New Zealand writer
Mike Johnson (The Real World), cast member of MTV reality series The Real World: London

Politicians
Michael Johnson (Australian politician) (born 1970), member of the Australian House of Representatives
 Michael Johnson (Alaska politician) (born 1972)
Michael Johnson (Wisconsin politician) (1832–1908), Reform member of the Wisconsin State Assembly
Mike Johnson (Louisiana politician) (born 1972), Republican member of the US House of Representatives from Bossier Parish
Mike Johnson (Oklahoma politician) (born 1944), Republican member of the Oklahoma Senate

Sports

American football
Mike Johnson (cornerback) (born 1943), American football player for the Dallas Cowboys, 1966–1969
Mike Johnson (linebacker) (born 1962), American football player, 1984–1995, mostly for the Cleveland Browns
Mike Johnson (American football coach) (born 1967), former offensive coordinator for the San Francisco 49ers
Michael Johnson (safety) (born 1984), American football player for the Detroit Lions. 2011–, New York Giants, 2007–2010
Michael Johnson (defensive end) (born 1987), American football player for the Tampa Bay Buccaneers 2014-, for the Cincinnati Bengals, 2009–2013
Mike Johnson (offensive lineman) (born 1987), American football player for the Atlanta Falcons, 2010–

Association football
Mike Johnson (footballer, born 1933) (1933–2004), English footballer and manager
Michael Johnson (footballer, born 1941) (1941–1991), Welsh international footballer (Swansea City)
Michael Johnson (footballer, born 1973), English-born Jamaican international footballer and manager
Michael Johnson (footballer, born 1988), English footballer (Manchester City)
Michael Johnson (footballer, born 1994), Maltese footballer

Other sports
Michael Johnson (Australian rules footballer) (born 1984), Australian rules player for the Fremantle Dockers, 2005–2018
Michael Johnson (bodybuilder), Canadian bodybuilder
Michael Johnson (canoeist) (born 1941), American Olympic canoeist
Michael Johnson (cricketer) (born 1988), Australian cricketer
Michael Johnson (field hockey) (born 1979), British former field hockey player
Michael Johnson (fighter) (born 1986), American mixed martial arts fighter
Michael Johnson (Gaelic footballer), former Antrim Gaelic footballer
Michael Johnson (sprinter) (born 1967), American World and Olympic Champion sprinter
Michael Johnson (sport shooter) (born 1973), New Zealand World and Paralympic Champion shooter
Mickey Johnson (born 1952), American basketball player
Mike Johnson (ice hockey) (born 1974), Canadian ice hockey player, 1997–2008
Mike Johnson (1990s pitcher) (born 1975), Canadian Olympic and Major League Baseball pitcher
Mike Johnson (1970s pitcher) (born 1951), American Major League Baseball player

Others
Crispus Attucks (1723–1770), sailor who may have used the alias "Michael Johnson"
Michael Johnson (criminal) (1977–2006), murdered Jeff Wetterman
 Michael Johnson (serial killer) (born 1986), American serial killer
Mike Johnson (technologist), technologist and pioneer in superscalar microprocessor design
Michael D. Johnson, Dean of Cornell University School of Hotel Administration
Michael P. Johnson (born 1942), American sociologist
Michael O. Johnson, American entrepreneur; CEO of Herbalife
Michael Johnson, convicted in the murder of Phylicia Barnes

See also
Michael Johnston (disambiguation)
Michael Johnsen, Australian politician
Michael Jonzun, musician and producer in the band Jonzun crew
Mikael Jonsson (born 1966), Swedish chef